Wolfgang Barthels (born 23 November 1940 in Marienburg) is a former German footballer.

Club career 
Barthels played more than 220 East German top-flight matches.

International career 
He won 2 caps for the East Germany national team.

References

External links 
 
 
 
 
 

1940 births
Living people
People from Malbork
People from West Prussia
Sportspeople from Pomeranian Voivodeship
German footballers
East German footballers
East Germany international footballers
Association football forwards
Olympic footballers of the United Team of Germany
Olympic bronze medalists for the United Team of Germany
Olympic medalists in football
Footballers at the 1964 Summer Olympics
Medalists at the 1964 Summer Olympics
FC Hansa Rostock players
DDR-Oberliga players
20th-century German people